Heckenberg is a suburb in south-western Sydney, in the state of New South Wales, Australia 36 kilometres south-west of the Sydney central business district, in the local government area of the City of Liverpool.

History
Heckenberg was named after a pioneering family who settled on land in the area before 1840. Casper Theodore Heckenberg was born in Plymouth, England in 1810 to parents Harriet and Henry, who later moved to Hull. Casper was a master mariner and operated ships between Sydney and Port Stephens in the logging trade. The family bought land in the Liverpool area and some of the Heckenberg sons became well known woodchoppers. James William Heckenberg was the Australasian Woodchopping Champion at the turn of the century. There were eight brothers and one sister in the Heckenberg family. Heckenberg was part of the Green Valley housing estate, which was subdivided in 1960.

Heckenberg Post Office opened on 1 July 1965 and closed in 1986.

Education
 Heckenberg Public School

Population
According to the 2016 census, Heckenberg had a population of 3,094 whose median age of 32 was substantially younger than the national median of 38. It is a low-income area with the median household income ($968 per week) significantly lower than the national median ($1,438). Aboriginal and Torres Strait Islander people made up 4.3% of the population. 51.4% of people in the suburb were born in Australia. The next most common countries of birth were Vietnam 10.0%, Lebanon 4.7% and Iraq 3.2%. 36.7% of people spoke only English at home. Other languages spoken at home included Arabic 18.2% and Vietnamese 15.0%. The most common responses for religion were Catholic 20.5%, Islam 19.0%, No Religion 13.1% and Buddhism 12.6%.

References

Suburbs of Sydney
City of Liverpool (New South Wales)